Guanaco is an animal similar to the llama.

Guanaco may also refer to:
 An informal term for residents of El Salvador
Guanaco hip hop, a style of music from El Salvador
Guanaca language, also spelled Guanaco
Guañacos, a village and municipality in Neuquén Province in southwestern Argentina

See also 
 Río Guanaco, a hamlet on Navarino Island in the Tierra del Fuego archipelago in southern Chile